San Quirico may refer to:
 Saint Quiricus (fl. 304), an early Christian martyr
 San Quirico, Sorano, a village in Tuscany, central Italy, administratively a frazione of the comune of Sorano, province of Grosseto
 San Quirico d'Orcia, a comune in the Province of Siena in the Italian region Tuscany
 San Quirico Martire, a Roman Catholic church in the frazione of Bolano, Salerno, Italy
 San Quirico, Spain

See also
 Quirico
 Saint-Cyr (disambiguation)